Amao Leota Lu (born 1971) is a Samoan fa’afafine, who is a performance artist, poet and community activist.

Biography 
Amao Leota Lu was born in 1971 in Auckland, New Zealand. Her early years were spent there, before emigrating with some of her Samoan diaspora family to Sydney in the 1980s. She returned to Australia after a period away in her early twenties and it was during this time that she came to terms with her gender identity as a woman and as a fa'afafine. She uses her performances to advocate for fa'afafine identity, particularly in resistance to western LGBT categorisations. These performances are situated at the confluence of gender identity, Pacific culture and intersectionality. 

In 2020 she curated the very first queer Pacific event at Midsumma Festival in Melbourne, and performed there with an event entitled Pacific Essence: Tales of a Migrant Plantation, which was staged at the Immigration Museum. In 2019 she was part of the ensemble cast of Gender Euphoria, which was staged as part of Melbourne International Arts Festival. Her performances are part of a "cult phenomena" where queer perspectives are combined with "Indigenous knowledge-making". Leota Lu is also outspoken about the discrimination that gender diverse members Pacific Islander communities still face. Former occupations have included community support worker.

References

External links 

 Archer: Fa’afafine: All Hail the Queen (Samoan Sashay)
 ABC Radio: Life for the transgender community outside Australia's cities
 YouTube: Amao Leota Lu
 YouTube: Bent TV: VIKA Incorporated – Amao Leota Lu, Part 1 of 2
 YouTube: Fa'afafine stories with Amao Leota Lu at Wonderfruit 2019

Fa'afafine
Samoan poets
Samoan artists
LGBT rights activists
1971 births
Living people
LGBT poets